Kenneth John Macksey  (1 July 1923 – 30 November 2005) was a British author and historian who specialized in military history and military biography, particularly of the Second World War. After serving in the Royal Armoured Corps from 1941 as a Driver Mechanic, Macksey was commissioned in 1944. He served during the rest of Second World War in the 79th Armoured Division under the command of Percy Hobart, earning a Military Cross; he later wrote a biography of Hobart. Macksey gained a permanent commission in 1946, was transferred to the Royal Tank Regiment in 1947, reached the rank of major in 1957 and retired from the Army in 1968.

Amongst many other books, Macksey wrote a volume of alternate history entitled Invasion, which dealt with a successful invasion of England by Germany in 1940. He also wrote the novel First Clash that describes a NATO–Warsaw Pact clash in the late 1980s and which seems in retrospect to be alternate history, but it was published in 1985 before the purported events of the conflict. First Clash was written under contract to the Canadian Forces and focuses on the Canadian role in such a conflict. Macksey also edited The Hitler Options, the first volume of a series of "alternate decisions" alternate history anthologies from Greenhill Books, in 1995.

In Macksey's Guderian: Panzer General, he debunked the view of historian Sir Basil Liddell-Hart regarding Hart's influence on the development of German tank theory before 1939.

Publications
 
 
 
 
 
 
 
 
 ; re-published as

Notes

1923 births
2005 deaths
Royal Armoured Corps officers
British Army personnel of World War II
British military writers
Recipients of the Military Cross
Historians of World War II
20th-century British historians
British biographers
Royal Tank Regiment officers